is a Japanese investor, bull, former bureaucrat of the MITI, co-founder of "Murakami Fund" (Japanese: 村上ファンド), and founder of the Murakami Family Foundation (村上財団).

About 
Murakami founded the “Murakami Fund”, with M&A Consulting, Inc. at its core. After graduating from University of Tokyo, he joined the Ministry of International Trade and Industry (the current Ministry of Economy, Trade and Industry), and in spending 16 years as a government employee, he came to the realization that Corporate Governance is crucial for the sustained growth of the Japanese economy, and decided to effect change by establishing a fund and becoming a player himself just before hitting the age of 40. He gained attention as a “vocal shareholder” through obtaining shares in publicly traded companies that fail to optimize their cash reserves and idle assets, and proactively making shareholder proposals to maximize enterprise values, at times making open critiques at shareholder meetings towards management that take shareholders lightly, in an environment where Japanese shareholders tend to be (or are perceived to be, as a generalization) passive towards getting involved in the management of corporations. His typical style of investment involves obtaining shares in a target corporation, and making them focus on profitable business domains in order to maximize shareholder value. Representative transactions include Tokyo Style, Nippon Broadcasting System, Hanshin Electric Railway, etc. As the sizes of investments grew, 6 years after the establishment of the Fund, Murakami was arrested for accusations of insider trading of shares in Nippon Broadcasting Systems, though there still are mixed opinions on the legal interpretation of the situation. One of his policies includes “money, for a corporation, is equivalent to blood for the human body. The flow of money (blood) is essential for the growth of corporations, and there are negative side effects to the health of a corporation if this flow is blocked.”

Idemitsu Kosan 

Idemitsu Kosan Co., Ltd. and Showa Shell Sekiyu K.K. entered into merger negotiations in July 2015, but the founding family of Idemitsu, major shareholders in the company, was against the merger, and discussions between the family and Idemitsu management were forced into a halt. In the fall of 2017, a person in the financial industry that was close to the founding family requested that Murakami advise the family. Murakami obtained under 1% of the outstanding shares in Idemitsu, in order to get involved “sincerely, with the perspective of a shareholder, and not as an outsider”. By February 2018 he was in contact with Idemitsu management, and bridged the gap between management and the founding family. On July 10, 2018, Idemitsu and Showa Shell officially announced their agreement to merge. Idemitsu Chairman Takashi Tsukioka made a rare public statement praising Murakami, saying “It is a fact that Murakami, a distinguished investor, advised the founding family from a fair standpoint on the necessity of the merger in order to maximize the joint benefit of all stakeholders including the founding family, improving the relationship between Idemitsu and the family. I thank him for his selfless efforts to date.”

Notes 

1959 births
Living people
Corporate raiders
Japanese government officials
Japanese investors
Japanese white-collar criminals
People convicted of insider trading
People from Osaka
University of Tokyo alumni
21st-century Japanese businesspeople
Japanese people of Taiwanese descent
Japanese people of Indian descent